Pimienta is a 1966 Argentine film directed by Carlos Rinaldi.

Cast
Patricia Scaliter
Amalia Scaliter

External links
 

1966 films
1960s Spanish-language films
Films directed by Carlos Rinaldi
Argentine comedy-drama films
1960s Argentine films